Fiona Campbell (12 May 1929 – 8 September 2005) was a British alpine skier. She competed in two events at the 1952 Winter Olympics.

References

1929 births
2005 deaths
British female alpine skiers
Olympic alpine skiers of Great Britain
Alpine skiers at the 1952 Winter Olympics
People from Hamilton, Bermuda